Keftes, also known as Keftikes in Sephardic cuisine, are croquettes, pancakes, patties, or fritters, usually made with vegetables, and other ingredients. Sephardic keftes are not the same as the non-Jewish kofta which are meatballs.  Keftes might not contain meat, as opposed to the kofta which do contain meat.

Some keftes are eaten on holidays due to the ingredients or method of cooking which may be associated with that holiday.

Varieties
 Keftes de karne—ground-beef meat patties
 Keftes de espinaka/spinaka—made with spinach
 Keftes de lentejas—lentil patties
 Keftes de gayina or Keftikes de poyo—chicken croquettes/chicken patties
 Keftes de patata kon karne—potato and meat patties
 Keftes de pescado/pescada/pishkado—croquettes made with fish and mashed potatoes.
 Keftes de prasa or Keftes de puero—made with leeks
 Keftes de prasa i karne—made with leeks and meat

Holidays
Keftes de prasa are popular all year round at holidays

Rosh Hashana
Keftikes de prassa  or keftes de prasa i karne are also known as yehi rasones or yehi ratsones (Hebrew: "May it be Your Will"). The leeks in this dish are a symbolic food on Rosh Hashana because of the puns of the name of the food in Hebrew or Aramaic. Leeks or foods made with leeks are eaten during a special seder on Rosh Hashana as a demonstration of a particular wish to be God's will. 

The symbolism of the leeks is the pun of its name in Hebrew, karti, which is similar to yikartu, meaning to be cut off. The yehi rason of karti is a wish that the enemies of Jews will be "cut off".

Hanukkah
Keftes de prasa especially, or any kefte for that matter, are eaten at Hanukkah because they are fried. Keftes de prasa, which are made without meat, are pancake-like and are particularly suited to being oily as are most Hanukkah foods.

Notes and references

mnl;k[lp[l[plk[k,[k[pl

External links
 Cooking Light Leek and Potato Fritters with Lemon-Cumin Yogurt

Bibliography
 A Fistful of Lentils: Syrian-Jewish Recipes from Grandma Fritzie's Kitchen, Jennifer Felicia Abadi, Harvard Common Press
 The New Jewish Holiday Cookbook, Gloria Kaufer Greene, Crown, 1999
 Sephardic Flavors: Jewish Cooking of the Mediterranean, Joyce Goldstein and Beatriz Da Costa, Chronicle Books, 2000
 Sephardic Israeli Cuisine: A Mediterranean Mosaic, Sheilah Kaufman, Hippocrene Books, 2002
 The Sephardic Table: The Vibrant Cooking of the Mediterranean Jews, Pamela Grau Twena, Houghton Mifflin Harcourt, 1998
 The World Of Jewish Cooking: More Than 500 Traditional Recipes from Alsace to Yemen, Gil Marks, Simon & Schuster, 1999

Hanukkah foods
Rosh Hashanah foods
Sephardi Jewish cuisine